Laurence Kinlan (born 3 February 1983) is an Irish actor in films, television series and on theatre stage. He is best known for playing the role of Elmo in RTÉ's crime drama Love/Hate.

Career

Film and television
Kinlan's debut was a lead role, his film debut at age 14 as David in Soft Sand, Blue Sea directed by Pip Broughton. It tells the story of kids living in a children's home. They are not orphans, but are children of disinterested parents and, as such, carry the scars of being unloved and rejected. He got the role in an open audition at the Belvedere club and despite having no previous acting experience he got the part.

His biggest role was as Elmo Creed in the long-running Irish TV series Love/Hate, a gritty crime drama based on Dublin's criminal underworld written by Stuart Carolan and directed by David Caffrey. The cult series that is broadcast on RTÉ but followed worldwide stars actor Tom Vaughan-Lawlor (as Nidge Delaney) and co-stars Peter Coonan (as Fran Cooney), Laurence Kinlan (as Elmo Creed), Aidan Gillen (as John Boy Power) and Robert Sheehan (as Darren Treacy). Kinlan's character Elmo has become so popular the Irish FM104 launched a song titled "Elmo's A Headcase!" sampling portions of Kinlan's voice and sampling of "Sexy and I Know It" as "Elmo and I Know It".

Another major screen role for Kinlan was his portrayal of Dan Kelly in the 2003 Gregor Jordan film Ned Kelly, with the title character of the Kelly Gang played by Heath Ledger. Other roles were in this film directed by included Orlando Bloom, Geoffrey Rush and Naomi Watts.

Kinlan has appeared in various roles in a number of films and TV series, including notably Veronica Guerin, The Halo Effect, Intermission, Boy Eats Girl, The Guard and many others. He played the Irish independent politician Tony Gregory in the biopic of ex-Taoiseach (Prime Minister of Ireland) Charles Haughey titled Charlie which aired in 2015 on RTÉ.

Theatre
He also landed roles on stage, particularly on the stages of Abbey Theatre and Peacock Theatre, Dublin as well as appearing in tours elsewhere on stages in London, New York etc. His theatre appearances include the role of Leonard in On Such As We, directed by Wilson Milam, in A Month in the Country, directed by Jason Byrne, Poor Beast in the Rain directed by Conor McPherson playing the role of Georgie for which he was nominated for the "Irish Times Best Supporting Actor Award" in 2006. Laurence appeared in Saved directed by Jimmy Fay The Playboy of the Western World directed by Jimmy Fay. Kinlan also played Bartley in a major production of Martin McDonagh's The Cripple of Inishmaan directed by Garry Hynes, at Dublin Theatre Festival and the Atlantic Theater Company, Manhattan, New York. He portrayed the character Mossey Lannigan in Christ Deliver Us!, a new play by Tom Kilroy directed by Wayne Jordan at the Abbey Theatre, again receiving "Irish Times Best Supporting Actor Award" in 2011. Another role he landed was The Covey, in Wayne Jordan's The Plough and the Stars.

Awards
2006: "Best Supporting Actor Award" at the Irish Times Theatre Awards for his role as Georgie in the play Poor Beast in the Rain staged in The Gate theatre in Dublin
2011: "Best Supporting Actor Award" at the Irish Times Theatre Awards for his role as Mossey Lannigan in the play Christ Deliver Us!, staged at the Abbey Theatre
2016: Best Supporting Actor Award" at the Irish Times Theatre Awards for his role as Doc in the play "The Night Alive" staged at the Gaiety Theatre

Personal life
Born into a family of four boys, with three brothers, Kinlan is the son of Larry and Mary Kinlan. They lived in inner city Dublin. His father died after suffering a long heroin addiction. Laurence was just 10 when his father died.

Laurence reportedly left school at 16 to pursue an acting career. He has 2 sons, Oren and Ollie.

Filmography
1998: Soft Sand, Blue Sea as David
1999: The Bill (TV Series, 1 episode – "Out and About" as Liam Ryan)
1999: Angela's Ashes as Older Paddy Clohessy
2000: Country as Michael
2000: Saltwater as Joe
2000: An Everlasting Piece as Mickey
2001: On the Nose as Kiaran Delaney
2001: Last Days in Dublin
2001: On Home Ground (1 episode – "John King" in lead role John King)
2003: Ned Kelly as Dan Kelly
2003: Veronica Guerin as Timmy, a young junky Timmy
2003: Intermission as a Drug Dealer
2004: The Halo Effect as a Thief
2005: Boy Eats Girl as Henry
2005: Breakfast on Pluto as Irwin
2006: Johnny Was as Michael
2006: Small Engine Repair as Tony
2007: My Boy Jack as Guardsman Doyle (TV film)
2011: The Guard as Photographer
2012: Vexed (TV Series – 1 episode – "Ian" as lead Ian)
2012: Immaturity for Charity (TV film)
2013: All Is by My Side as John
2013: Love/Hate (TV Series – Season 4 – 11 episodes))
2014: The Game (TV mini-series – 1 episode – "IRA Monkey")
2014: Charlie (TV mini-series – 1 episode "Tony Gregory" as lead act Tony Gregory)

Theatre
On Such As We (2001) – role of Leonard
By Billy Roche directed by Wilson Milam, Peacock Theatre, Dublin
Defender of the Faith (2004) – role of Thomas, an active volunteer
Play by Stuart Carolan, Peacock Theatre, Dublin
Poor Beast in the Rain (2005) as Georgie
By Billy Roche directed by Conor McPherson, Gate Theatre, Dublin
A Month in the Country (2006) – role of Aleksey Nikolayevich Belyayev
By Ivan Turgenev, adapted by Brian Friel, directed by Jason Byrne, Abbey Theatre, Dublin
Saved (2007) – role of Sean
By Edward Bond, directed by Jimmy Fay, Peacock Theatre, Dublin
The Playboy of the Western World – A New Version (2007) – role of Sean
by John Millington Synge. Adaptation by Bisi Adigun and Roddy Doyle. Directed by Jimmy Fay [Abbey Theatre]
Christ Deliver Us! (2010) – role of Mossey Lannigan
By Tom Kilroy, directed by Wayne Jordan, [Abbey Theatre]
The Plough and the Stars (2010) – role of The Young Covey
By Seán O'Casey, directed By Wayne Jordan [Abbey Theatre and international tour]
The Cripple of Inishmaan (2011) – role of Bartley
Written by Martin McDonagh in Druid Theatre Company production. Play directed by Garry Hynes, [Dublin Theatre Festival and UK and Irish tour, Atlantic Theater Company, New York]
Curse of the Starving Class (2011) – role of Emerson
By Sam Shepard [Abbey Theatre]

References

External links

Lisa Richards Agency: Laurence Kinlan page
Abbey Theatre: Laurence Kinlan in Abbey Productions

1983 births
Living people
Male actors from Dublin (city)
Irish male film actors
Irish male television actors
Irish male stage actors